James Vance (April 2, 1953 – June 5, 2017) was an American comic book writer, author and playwright, best known for his work from Kitchen Sink Press and in particular the lauded Kings in Disguise.

Biography
Vance's introduction into comics writing came in 1988, with his Kitchen Sink-published limited series, Kings in Disguise, later collected by W. W. Norton, with an introduction by the legendary Alan Moore, who calls it:
"One of the most moving and compelling human stories to emerge out of the graphic story medium."
This work, with art by Dan Burr, earned both a Harvey Award and an Eisner Award (both 1989) for best new series, as well as another Eisner Award for Best Single Issue (also 1989). It also made the list of the one hundred best comic book stories of all time.

In 2013, Vance and Burr published On the Ropes, the long-awaited sequel to Kings in Disguise.  On the Ropes was positively reviewed by, among others, the Los Angeles Times, Publishers Weekly, and writer Alan Moore.

Vance also wrote Neil Gaiman's Mr. Hero the Newmatic Man for Tekno Comix in the mid-1990s, and was co-editor of Alan Moore and Melinda Gebbie's Lost Girls as originally serialised by Kitchen Sink Press. He has also contributed scripts towards comics featuring The Crow, and the Dark Horse Comics-published licensed properties Aliens and Predator.

Vance was married to cartoonist Kate Worley for the last ten years of her life before she succumbed to cancer in 2004. After Worley's death, Vance edited and completed (with artist Reed Waller) the final chapters of her Omaha the Cat Dancer strip, which were serialized in Sizzle magazine. He died on June 5, 2017 from cancer.

Bibliography
Comics work includes:

 Kings in Disguise (Kitchen Sink Press, 1988) — with artist Dan Burr
 Mr. Hero the Newmatic Man (Tekno Comix, 1995)
 Batman: Legends of the Dark Knight: Idols #80–82 (DC Comics, 1996) — with artists Dougie Braithwaite and Sean Hardy
 Aliens: Survival (Dark Horse, 1998)
 Predator: Homeworld (Dark Horse, 1999)
 Omaha the Cat Dancer in Sizzle #28–30, 32, 34–35, 38–40, 42–44, 46–49, 51, 53, 55, 56 (Eurotica, NBM Publishing, 2005–2012) — with artist Reed Waller
 On the Ropes (W. W. Norton, 2013) — with artist Dan Burr

Awards and nominations
In addition to his 1989 Eisner and Harvey Awards wins (with Dan Burr), Vance was also a 1990 Eisner-nominee with Burr for Kings in Disguise, and a 1991-nominee as best writer.

Notes

References

1953 births
2017 deaths
American comics writers
People from Muskogee, Oklahoma
Eisner Award winners for Best New Series